Harry Struben born Hendrik Wilhelm Struben aka Henry William Struben (9 October 1840 Lower Rhine, Germany - 18 October 1915 Rosebank, Cape Town)  was the brother of Frederick Struben, who together managed the first gold-mining operation on the Reef. They were the sons of Johan Marinus Struben (1806 Oosterwijk, Holland), a South African Republic official, and his wife Frances Sarah Beattie of Scottish origin. Harry was born during a yacht trip along the Lower Rhine. His family emigrated to Pietermaritzburg in Natal in 1850, and moved to Pretoria five years after.

Harry started as a transport rider, carrying goods between Natal and the Transvaal. In 1862 he bought the farm 'The Willows' on the outskirts of Pretoria. He also took to prospecting and found deposits of gold, copper and iron. In January 1868 he was married Mary L. Cole and they raised a family of eight children. In 1872 he and a certain Piet Marais bought two farms in the Lydenburg district. Harry was elected to the Volksraad in October 1876, representing the constituency of Pretoria East.

Having been hard hit financially by the First Anglo-Boer War (1880-1881) Struben embarked on mining ventures with his younger brother, Frederick. They founded the Sterkfontein Junction Mining Syndicate in 1884, exploring the farms Sterkfontein and Swartkrans. At the time their efforts focused almost entirely on quartz reefs, little realising that gold on the Witwatersrand was confined primarily to conglomerate beds. In August 1884 Fred came across a promising quartz outcrop on the farm Wilgespruit and it was named Confidence Reef. The Transvaal government assisted in financing its exploitation in 1885, but the yields proved to be disappointing. Their mining activities attracted other fortune-seekers to the area, and the extremely rich Main Reef conglomerate was found on the farm Langlaagte in 1886.

Struben was elected to the first Diggers' Committee in Johannesburg in March 1887, and later that same year became the first president of the Chamber of Mines, founded to promote the mining industry in the Transvaal. He also served as board member for a number of mining companies, and was first Director (1875-6) of the Delagoa Bay Railway. In 1889 he sold his mining rights on the farms Driefontein and Vogelstruisfontein, and retired to Rosebank, Cape Town.

Ill-health curtailed his activities, but even so he enjoyed his membership of the South African Philosophical Society during the 1890s. His one contribution to geology came as a chapter on "The mineral wealth of the Transvaal" in "Diamonds and Gold in the Transvaal" (1893) by T. Reunert. His "Recollections of adventures: Pioneering and development in South Africa, 1850-1911" (Cape Town, 1920) was revised and edited by his daughter Edith. Strubenskop in Pretoria and Strubens Valley in Johannesburg were named after the brothers.

During the two Anglo-Boer Wars Struben remained a staunch supporter of the Boer cause.

References

External links
"Recollections of adventures: Pioneering and development in South Africa, 1850-1911"

1840 births
1915 deaths
Randlords
Members of the Volksraad of the South African Republic
South African mining businesspeople
German emigrants to South Africa